The Calore Irpino or Calore Beneventano or Calore river is a river in southwestern Italy. It rises from Colle Finestra ( above sea level), a mountain saddle between Monte Acellica and the Terminio sub-group in the Monti Picentini, sub-range of the Apennine Mountains. The river flows first in the province of Avellino, and then in that of Benevento, before flowing into the Volturno. In ancient times it was known as Calor.

Overview
On 8 May 663, a large detachment of the army of the Eastern Emperor Constans II, which had invaded the Lombard Duchy of Benevento, was defeated here in battle by the army of King Grimoald, under the joined command of Mitola, Count of Capua, and Grimoald's son, Romuald.

Having already abandoned the siege of Benevento and every small conquest done in Italy, Constans, falling back to Naples, lost any hope to push back the Lombards and re-establish Byzantine sovereignty over southern Italy.

Sources

External links

Rivers of Italy
Rivers of the Province of Avellino
Rivers of the Province of Benevento